Fat Actress is an American comedy television series starring Kirstie Alley. In the United States, it aired on Showtime from March 7 to April 18, 2005. The series was created and written by Alley and Brenda Hampton.

Premise
Alley gave a glimpse of the humor and the irony in her battle to lose weight and get back on television in a tough business that prefers the svelte figures seen on the most successful actresses of today. The series was generally unscripted, with each episode emanating from a story outline and the actors largely improvising the dialogue. The storylines were drawn from a heightened perception of Alley's real-life experiences, and some of Alley's friends appeared as themselves in cameos to further blur the lines between truth and fiction.

Cast and characters

Main
 Kirstie Alley as Kirstie Alley, a successful television and film star whose weight gain has become the subject of every tabloid imaginable, as well as the blight of her existence as she tries to find work and true love in an unforgiving Hollywood.
 Rachael Harris as Kevyn Shecket, Kirstie's live-in hair stylist. Unlike Eddie, she is more of a best friend to Kirstie.
 Bryan Callen as Eddie Falcone, Kirstie's personal assistant who lives in her garage. He himself is desperate for Hollywood work; at any chance he gets, he brings up a Hollywood film he did which is "taking film festivals by storm".

Recurring
 Michael McDonald as Sam Rascal, Kirstie's manager who disappoints her.  
 Kelly Preston as Quinn Taylor Scout, a young and very famous Hollywood starlet. She is bulimic and helps Kirstie lose much weight as possible, with the craziest and most dangerous diets.

Celebrity cameos
Several Hollywood celebrities appeared in the series as themselves:

John Travolta
Mayim Bialik
Kid Rock
Larry King
Merv Griffin
Rhea Perlman
Jeff Zucker
Carmen Electra
Leah Remini
Melissa Gilbert

Production
Fat Actress was announced in July 2004, with plans to produce six episodes beginning in the fall. Harris and Callen were cast in September 2004. Filming took place in Los Angeles, California. Seven episodes were produced.

Episodes

Broadcast
In the United States, Fat Actress premiered on Showtime on March 7, 2005. The series premiere gave the network its highest series ratings, a record that was not beaten until October 2006. Viewership dropped dramatically after the first two episodes aired.

The series aired on Movie Central in Western Canada, The Movie Network in Eastern Canada, FX in the UK, Network Ten in Australia and VOX, it aired on Fox Life in Italy and Das Vierte in Germany.

Home media
A week after its premiere, Showtime announced plans to rush the series' DVD release in order to capitalize on an unusually high awareness of the program. The DVD was scheduled for release on May 24, 2005, rather than the usual six-to-nine-month waiting period for most Showtime shows. The series was added to iTunes in February 2006.

Reception
Fat Actress received mixed reviews. Brian Lowry of Variety wrote a negative review, while Entertainment Weekly gave the series a "C−". Nathan Rabin deemed Fat Actress a "failure" in his "My World of Flops" column for The A.V. Club, saying "There is both laughter and poignancy to be gleaned from our culture’s obsession with thinness and cruelty towards those who come up short, but all Fat Actress is after is laughs, the cruder and cheaper the better."

References

External links
 

2000s American sitcoms
2005 American television series debuts
2005 American television series endings
English-language television shows
Cultural depictions of American women
Body image in popular culture
Showtime (TV network) original programming
Television series created by Brenda Hampton
Television series about television